THAICOM 8 is a Thai satellite of the THAICOM series, operated by Thaicom Public Limited Company, a subsidiary of INTOUCH, and is considered to be the 8th THAICOM satellite headquartered in Bangkok, Thailand.

Overview 
Manufactured by Orbital ATK, the  THAICOM 8 communications satellite will serve Thailand, India, and Africa from the 78.5° East geostationary location. It is equipped with 24 active Ku-band transponders for sending high-definition television signals through the satellite to residential dwellings.

Launch
THAICOM 8 was approved for launch into orbit on 18 March 2014. It was launched at the Cape Canaveral SLC-40 in Florida on 27 May 2016, by SpaceX. The first stage of the Falcon 9 used to launch THAICOM 8 successfully landed on ASDS - Of Course I Still Love You. It was the fourth successful landing of a Falcon 9 Full Thrust.

Reuse of the Falcon 9 First Stage
The B1023 first stage was later converted into a Falcon Heavy side booster, which performed a static fire test in calendar-week 20 of 2017. This first stage then continued to land again at the Landing Zone 1 at Cape Canaveral Air Force Station during the Falcon Heavy maiden test flight.

See also

 Thaicom 4
 Thaicom 5
 Thaicom 6
 Thaicom 7
 List of Falcon 9 and Falcon Heavy launches

References

External links
 THAICOM 8 Information
 THAICOM 8 mission overview at SpaceX
 SpaceX Launch Webcast

Communications satellites in geostationary orbit
Thaicom satellites
SpaceX commercial payloads
Spacecraft launched in 2016
2016 in Thailand
Satellites using the GEOStar bus